Reverence is "a feeling or attitude of deep respect tinged with awe; veneration". The word "reverence" in the modern day is often used in relationship with religion. This is because religion often stimulates the emotion through recognition of a god, the supernatural, and the ineffable. Reverence involves a humbling of the self in respectful recognition of something perceived to be greater than the self. Thus religion is commonly a place where reverence is felt.

However, similar to awe, reverence is an emotion in its own right, and can be felt outside of the realm of religion. Whereas awe may be characterized as an overwhelming "sensitivity to greatness," reverence is seen more as "acknowledging a subjective response to something excellent in a personal (moral or spiritual) way, but qualitatively above oneself"  Solomon describes awe as passive, but reverence as active, noting that the feeling of awe (i.e., becoming awestruck) implies paralysis, whereas feelings of reverence are associated more with active engagement and responsibility toward that which one reveres. Nature, science, literature, philosophy, great philosophers, leaders, artists, art, music, wisdom, and beauty may each act as the stimulus and focus of reverence.

Religion and music 

David Pugmire's article, "The Secular Reception of Religious Music" explores the unique experience of reverence through music. In particular he looks at how religious music has the capacity to instill emotions of reverence, awe, wonder, and veneration in secular people who lack the context to fully understand the transcendent through religion. "Sacred music seems to have a surprising power over unbelievers not just to quicken or delight them as other music does, but also to ply them, as little else can, with what might be called devotional feelings". Even with this though, Pugmire argues that the secularist cannot fully comprehend the nature of sacred art including sacred music. "Its undoubted expressiveness can lead him at most to accesses of feeling, not to emotion in the fullest sense, i.e., emotion with appropriate objects sustained by appropriate judgments".

Pugmire believes that reverence belongs to the range of emotions that can be classified in their devotional or sacred forms, "Emotions of reverence, solemnity, agape, hope, serenity, and ecstasy". But this classification of emotions poses an interesting question: can any emotion be purely religious? "A central candidate for a distinctively religious emotion would be reverence". But it is not entirely distinct from the rest of the emotions that are not related to transcendence or religion. "Reverence is indeed graver, and an attitude in which one is more given over, than its secular approximations in the shape of approval or esteem or respect". But this does not make it purely religious. In fact, "Kant was able to claim reverence as our principal moral emotion without invoking any grounding theological basis for this". "Similarly for its bracing sibling, awe: it figures in our experience of the sublime, of which Kant purports to find an entirely secular account". To connect the secular and the sacred emotions Pugmire looks at the emotions which can be experienced equally in both contexts. These are, "Love, humility, sorrow, pity, joy, serenity, ecstasy". Pugmire then suggests that devotional emotion is: "The transfiguring of mundane emotion into what one might call emotion of the last instance, to the reception and expression of which religious imagery is especially well-suited, and not accidentally". The emotion of the last instance refers to the capacity of the emotional imagination to lose the sense of self and engage in the infinite and the ineffable. Pugmire is suggesting that religion, "Provides a strikingly apt vocabulary for the expression of emotion of the last instance". Reverence is perhaps the most critical of these "emotions of the last instance" and can be adequately accessed through religious music.

Theorists

Paul Woodruff 
Paul Woodruff in his book, Reverence: Renewing a Forgotten Virtue, assesses the current understanding of the emotion reverence in the modern era. He assesses that a true understanding of reverence is missing from both modern society and the "modern discussions of the ancient cultures that prized it" (Woodruff, p. 3). Specifically these ancient cultures include Greece and China. Woodruff's best definition of Reverence is, "The well-developed capacity to have the feelings of awe, respect, and shame when these are the right feelings to have" (Woodruff, p. 8). Thus Woodruff's definition of reverence includes the combination of three other emotions: respect, shame, and awe. "Respect is for other people, shame is over one’s own shortcomings, and awe is usually felt toward something transcendent" (Woodruff, p. 65).
Although Woodruff acknowledges the relationship between reverence and religion he argues that, "Reverence has more to do with politics than with religion" (Woodruff, p. 4). Woodruff in his book is trying to separate the common misunderstanding that reverent emotions can only be related to religion.

Woodruff sees ceremony and ritual as key elements in meaningful human life when practiced with reverence. "Without reverence, rituals are empty" (Woodruff, p. 19). Ceremony and ritual are found at home, in meetings, in voting, and in religion and these acts provide the context for feeling reverence. But often these situations are so common the emotion reverence disappears from human consciousness. "Ritual and reverence in common life are so familiar that we scarcely notice them until they are gone" (Woodruff, p. 35). Woodruff argues that, "Reverence, ceremony and respect do not disappear, they cannot disappear from a functioning society" (Woodruff, p. 36). He states that "What we are losing is not reverence, but the idea of reverence" (Woodruff, p. 36). It is his hope that the importance of reverence will be recognized in society again and that this recognition will better humanity. He proposes to "Restore the idea of reverence to its proper place in ethical and political thought" (Woodruff, p. 38).

Woodruff understands true reverence to be for things beyond human control. "The object of reverence is the ideal of unity, because that transcends politics altogether" (Woodruff, p. 28). Thus reverence focuses on an ideal that transcends the scope of humankind. This ideal can vary from God, to unity, to anything else that transcends human capacity. "Reverence sets a higher value on the truth than on any human product that is supposed to have captured the truth" (Woodruff, p. 39). He goes on to say that, "The principal object of reverence is Something that reminds us of human limitations" (Woodruff, p. 65). Reverence therefore is related to truth and the recognition that mankind cannot acquire absolute truth and that human life is finite.

Woodruff describes how reverence is often activated through music. Woodruff claims that "Reverence cannot be expressed in a creed; its most apt expression is in music" (Woodruff, p. 123). He gives the analogy of a quartet of varying skill levels playing a piece by Mozart. They embody reverence because: "(1) The musicians have been engaged, more or less harmoniously, on a project as a group; (2) their project involved ceremony; (3) they have felt themselves largely without ego; (4) they have felt themselves to be part of a clearly defined hierarchy that was painless for all of them; and (5) they have achieved in the end a shared feeling of inarticulate awe" (Woodruff, p. 48-49). This coincides with his belief that "Art speaks the language of reverence better than philosophy does, and speak(s) it to the reverence that is already in the town" (Woodruff, p. 25). By "in the town" Woodruff is referring to the recognition of reverence that is already present.

"In the presence of death we expect ourselves and others to be reverent; the expectation feels natural, and yet the ceremonies through which we express reverence at such times take very different forms in different cultures" (Woodruff, p. 50). In his conversation on funerals as times of reverence he makes the point that reverence transcends faith and that it is constant throughout human history even when religions change (Woodruff, p. 54.). "You need not believe in God to be reverent, but to develop an occasion for reverence you must share a culture with others, and this must support a degree of ceremony" (Woodruff, p. 50). Reverence is not dependent on religion, but true religious experience is dependent on the emotion reverence.

Paul Woodruff builds his case on reverence by analyzing the historical significance of reverence as a virtue. In Ancient Greek and Chinese civilizations, "Both cultures celebrate reverence in the belief that it is reverence above all that maintains social order and harmony" (Woodruff, p. 60). For the Greeks reverence was rooted in mythology. "Protagoras invented a myth in which the highest god gave reverence and justice to human beings as means for the survival of society" (Woodruff, p. 57). This foundation was critical because "Emotions affect action; they are motivators" (Woodruff, p. 62). Reverence in classical Greek society then motivated the populous to act rightly and be humble to improve society. "We feel awe for what we believe is above us all as human beings, and this feeling helps us to avoid treating other human beings with contempt" (Woodruff, p. 63).

Woodruff uses the Greek heroes and Athenian tragedies to illustrate his conception of reverence. He uses the story of Croesus by Herodotus to help shape an understanding of reverence that includes respect for those lower in hierarchical status. "A reverent soul listens to other people even when they are inferior; that is a large part of remembering that you are human together with them" (Woodruff, p. 83). He also illustrates reverence with the Iliad, Antigone, Pentheus, Pericles, Socrates, Plato, Oedipus, and the Odyssey. Through these figures he shows that reverence was quite significant in Greek culture. In Oedipus, Woodruff asserts that, "Hubris is best understood simply as the opposite of reverence, in action or attitude" (Woodruff, p. 91).

After building his case with a look at classical Greek culture he looks at classical Chinese Confucian society. "Filial piety expresses reverence within the family" (Woodruff, p. 103). The most important part of his connection between reverence and the Chinese is his understanding of li. "Li refers also to civility or reverence" (Woodruff, p. 105). One interesting connection between Greek and Chinese societies is that, "Both conceptions of reverence blossom with the passing away of polytheism and the rise of agnosticism. Reverence survives and flourishes in these circumstances because it is something that human beings need in order to face the most obvious, common, and inevitable facts of human life – family, hierarchy, and death" (Woodruff, p. 110). Most of his information on reverence in Chinese culture derives from the Analects. Woodruff believes that a break in tradition is not necessarily irreverent and that relativism is flawed. People should be critical of all cultures and forms of reverence (Woodruff, p. 155).

Abraham Maslow 
Abraham Maslow in his significant work, Religions, Values, and Peak-Experiences, deals extensively with reverence. Reverence is critical in having a peak-experience. He makes the case that peak-experiences happen for the religious and non-religious alike and that they are critical to having a fulfilling life. For Maslow the distinction between the secular and the profane is unfortunate. Maslow points out that, "Religionizing only one part of life secularizes the rest of it". Maslow contends that religion seeks to make the emotion reverence possible through ritual, but that the familiarity of it often negates any reverent feelings. In defining peak-experiences Maslow states that, "Such emotions as wonder, awe, reverence, humility, surrender, and even worship before the greatness of the experience are often reported". Reverence therefore is a key ingredient in the peak-experiences that make life worth living and make mankind feel fully human.

Albert Schweitzer 
Albert Schweitzer, winner of the Nobel Peace Prize and holder of four PhD degrees, sought for years for the basis of a new worldview. One day, while in a boat on the river in Gabon, it struck him with great force and clarity: "Reverence for life" (In German: Ehrfurcht vor dem Leben).

Empirical studies

Patient recovery 
Empirical studies on reverence are scarce. However, one intriguing study on reverence is, "Prayer and reverence in naturalistic, aesthetic, and socio-moral contexts predicted fewer complications following coronary artery bypass," conducted by Ai et al. (2009). These researchers looked at reverence following a coronary artery bypass. Ai et al. (2009) examined a "sense of reverence in religious and secular contexts" by interviewing 177 patients. Specifically they were investigating the faith-health relationship and seeking to find if religious forms of reverence practiced through faith and prayer yielded similar results to secular forms of reverence in patient recovery. Ai et al. (2009)state that, "Because reverence includes an affective as well as a cognitive component, we see it as a form of positive feeling/emotion associated with injection of the sacred into various worldviews". These positive emotions were believed to help in patient recovery. The first finding of Ai et al. (2009) was consistent with other research that found "Positive influences of traditional religious involvement on health outcomes". The second finding of Ai et al. (2009) was the "Positive effect of secular reverence on postoperative no-complication". From this Ai et al. (2009) inferred that, "The capacity to sense reverence in significant naturalistic, moralistic, and aesthetic contexts seems to enhance recovery following bypass". Strangely, "Religious reverence did not have the same beneficial effect as secular reverence on bypass recovery". This inconsistency suggests that more research needs to be done on reverence in patient recovery.

Awe 
Keltner and Haidt's extensive study on awe focuses on the importance of vastness and accommodation in experiencing awe. "Vastness refers to anything that is experienced as being much larger than the self". Accommodation refers to the "Process of adjusting mental structures that cannot assimilate a new experience". Their research on awe, which is a part of reverence, and how it is experienced through moral, spiritual, and aesthetic means, sheds light on the greater understanding of reverence. Their study also consists of a comprehensive summary on what has been "Written about awe in religion, philosophy, sociology, and psychology" and their own addition of "Related states such as admiration, elevation, and the epiphanic experience".

Haidt (2000)  notes that since Maslow (1964)  studied the changes that actualizing experiences can bring about in people's identities and in their moral and spiritual lives, little empirical research has been done to examine the peak experiences and moral transformations associated with positive moral emotions such as gratitude, elevation, awe, admiration, and reverence. Haidt's own work in these areas suggests that potent feelings of reverence may be associated with the peak experiences accompanying moral transformations, where, "Powerful moments of elevation sometimes seem to push a mental ‘reset button,’ wiping out feelings of cynicism and replacing them with feelings of hope, love, and optimism, and a sense of moral inspiration."

Art and mortality 
Great artists in the creation of their art sometimes give concrete form to the culturally derived beliefs, values, and group identities that provide meaning and purpose to existence. Moreover, reverence for artwork that instantiates these central aspects of culture can provide a means of buffering the existential anxiety that follows from reminders of the inevitability of human mortality. Across history, cultures have revered art as a "forum for representing in an enduring medium those individuals who are held up as embodiments of virtue and lasting significance."

Transpersonality 
Thomas and Schlutsmeyer in, "A Place for the Aesthetic in Experiential Personal Construct Psychology," look at reverence through the lens of experiential personal construct psychology (EPCP). Leitner & Pfenninger, in 1994, theorized this form of psychology in "Sociality and optimal functioning." Under this umbrella of psychology, "Reverence felt in meaningful interpersonal connectedness is one starting point for the development of a larger sense of connection with the world and the many others (human and nonhuman) in it". This is referred to as transpersonal reverence.
Thomas and Schlutsmeyer make the case for reverence in therapy: "In EPCP, reverence, as we stated earlier, is a goal of therapy, a sign of optimal functioning". The therapist must revere the patient and the patient must learn to revere others and themselves in order for the therapy to be effective.

Quotations 
 "Above all things, reverence yourself." Pythagoras
 "Let parents bequeath to their children not riches, but the spirit of reverence." Plato
 "We know reverence first hand wherever we are truly at home." Paul Woodruff
 "Reverence does not die with mortals, nor does it perish whether they live or die." Sophocles
 "He that will have his son have a respect for him and his orders must have a great reverence for his son." John Locke
 "Reverence for Human Worth, earnest devout search for it and encouragement of it, loyal furtherance and obedience to it: this, I say, is the outcome and essence of all true "religions," and was and ever will be." Thomas Carlyle
 "In this world there is one godlike thing, the essence of all that was or ever will be of godlike in this world: the veneration done to Human Worth by the hearts of men." Thomas Carlyle
 "I love and reverence the Word, the bearer of the spirit, the tool and gleaming ploughshare of progress." Thomas Mann
 "Pursue some path, however narrow and crooked, in which you can walk with love and reverence." Henry David Thoreau
 "By having a reverence for life, we enter into a spiritual relation with the world. By practicing reverence for life we become good, deep, and alive." Albert Schweitzer
 "Gratitude bestows reverence, allowing us to encounter everyday epiphanies, those transcendent moments of awe that change forever how we experience life and the world." John Milton
 "Who is to decide what ought to command my reverence--my neighbor or I? . . You can't have reverence for a thing that doesn't command it. If you could do that, you could digest what you haven't eaten, and do other miracles and get a reputation." Mark Twain, a Biography 
 "Fullness of knowledge always means some understanding of the depths of our ignorance; and that is always conducive to humility and reverence." Robert Millikan
 "The roots, or common principles of human morality are to be found in moral feelings such as commiseration, shame, respect, and reverence." Wing-Tsit Chan
 "Juvenal said that the greatest reverence is due the young (14.47), deliberately reversing the tradition that directs reverence ever upward." Paul Woodruff
 "Reverence for truth leads to humility in the face of the awesome task of getting something right" Paul Woodruff
 "Reverence in the classroom calls for a sense of awe in the face of the truth and a recognition by teachers and students of their places in the order of learning." Paul Woodruff
 Tennyson, "gave us the finest expression of reverence that we have in the English language, "In Memoriam".

See also 
In Memoriam by Tennyson 
Deference
Emotion
Moral emotions
Social emotions

References

External links 

 Keltner, D., & Haidt, J. (2003). Approaching awe, a moral, spiritual, and aesthetic emotion. Cognition and Emotion, 17(2), 297–314. 
 Leitner, L. M., & Pfenninger, D. T. (1994). Sociality and optimal functioning. Journal of Constructivist Psychology, 7, 119–135.
 Maslow, A. H. (1964). Religions, values, and peak-experiences, . Columbus: Ohio State University Press.
 Online Etymology Dictionary. (n.d.). Online Etymology Dictionary. Retrieved April 28, 2011, from http://www.etymonline.com/index.php?term=reverence
 Pugmire, D. (2006). The Secular Reception of Religious Music. Philosophy, 81(315), 65–79. 
 Thomas, J. C., & Schlutsmeyer, M. W. (2004). A place for the aesthetic in experiential personal construct psychology. Journal of Constructivist Psychology, 17(4), 313–335. 
 Woodruff, P. (2001). Reverence : renewing a forgotten virtue . Oxford: Oxford University Press.

Emotions
Psychology of religion
Religious practices
Ritual
Morality
Virtue ethics
Honor
Sociology of religion